DWAD-TV is a commercial television station owned by ABS-CBN Corporation. Its studio and transmitter is located at Barangay Magsaysay, Bayombong, Nueva Vizcaya.

ABS-CBN TV-34 Bayombong local programs
 TV Patrol North Luzon

See also
List of ABS-CBN Corporation channels and stations

ABS-CBN stations
Television channels and stations established in 2008
Television stations in Nueva Vizcaya